Donald Sternoff Beyer Jr. (born June 20, 1950) is an American businessman, diplomat, and politician serving as the U.S. representative for  since 2015. A member of the Democratic Party, his district is in the heart of Northern Virginia and includes Alexandria, Falls Church, and Arlington.

Beyer has owned automobile dealerships in Virginia and has a long record of involvement in community and philanthropic work. From 1990 to 1998 he served as the 36th lieutenant governor of Virginia during the gubernatorial administrations of Doug Wilder (1990–1994) and George Allen (1994–1998). His party's nominee for governor of Virginia in 1997, he lost to Republican Jim Gilmore, who was then the Attorney General of Virginia. From 2009 to 2013, he served as United States Ambassador to Switzerland and Liechtenstein under President Barack Obama.

In 2014, Beyer announced his candidacy for the U.S. House of Representatives seat for  held by the retiring Jim Moran. Beyer won the 12-candidate Democratic primary in June with 45% of the vote and defeated Republican Micah Edmond, 63% to 33%, in the general election.

Early life and education
Beyer was born in the Free Territory of Trieste, the son of a U.S. Army officer, Donald Sternoff Beyer Sr., and his wife, Nancy McDonald. His grandmother Clara Mortenson Beyer was a pioneer in labor economics and workers' rights, and worked in the United States Department of Labor under Frances Perkins during the New Deal era. His grandfather Otto S. Beyer Jr. was Chairman of the National Mediation Board. The oldest of six children, he was raised in Washington, D.C., where his grandparents lived. 

In 1968, he graduated from Gonzaga College High School, where he was salutatorian of his class; in 1972 he graduated Phi Beta Kappa from Williams College, magna cum laude, in economics. Beyer was a Presidential Scholar in 1968 and a National Merit Scholarship winner. He graduated from a winter Outward Bound course at Dartmouth College in January 1971, and attended Wellesley College that year as part of the "12 College Exchange" program.

In 2022, during his congressional career, Beyer enrolled at George Mason University in pursuit of a master's degree in artificial intelligence, taking one evening course per semester. He told The Washington Post in December 2022 that he was taking required undergraduate courses before he started graduate coursework, which he expected to begin by 2024.

Business career
After college, Beyer began working at the Volvo dealership his father had purchased in 1973. In 1986, he and his brother Michael bought the business from their parents, and as the Beyer Automotive Group, the business expanded to five dealerships, including the Volvo, Land Rover, Kia, Volkswagen, Mazda, and Subaru brands. Beyer sold his share of the dealerships to his brother in 2019. Beyer is a past chairman of the National Volvo Retailer Advisory Board. In 2006, he chaired the American International Automobile Dealers Association.

Beyer served as a member of the board of Demosphere International, Inc., a leading soccer registration software provider. He was also a board member of History Associates, which bills itself as "The Best Company in History." He has served on the Virginia Board of First Union National Bank, the board of Shenandoah Life Insurance Company, and the board of Lightly Expressed, a fiber optic lighting design and manufacturing firm.

Civic activism
During nearly two decades of community activism, Beyer has taken leadership roles on the boards of many business, philanthropic and public policy organizations, the Fairfax County Chamber of Commerce and the American Cancer Society. He has received numerous awards and honors, including the Grand Award for Highway Safety from the National Safety Federation; the James C. Wheat Jr. Award for Service to Virginians with Disabilities; the Earl Williams Leadership in Technology Award; and the Thomas Jefferson Award for 2012 from American Citizens Abroad. 

In 2017, he received the Leaders for Democracy Award from the Project on Middle East Democracy. In April 2017, he received the Community Integration Leadership Award for Community and Public Service from the ENDependence Center of Northern Virginia and the Community Engagement Award from Phillips Programs for Children and Families. In 2021, Beyer received the Excellence in Public Service Award from the Population Association of America.

Beyer chaired the board of the Alexandria Community Trust, Alexandria's community foundation, and the board of Jobs for Virginia Graduates, the state's largest high school dropout prevention program. He is a former president of the board of Youth for Tomorrow, Washington Redskins coach Joe Gibbs's residential home for troubled adolescent boys and girls. He also served on the board of the DC Campaign to Prevent Teen Pregnancy. He currently serves on the board of directors of Jobs for America's Graduates.

In 2022, readers and editors of Arlington Magazine named Beyer "Best Elected Official" as part of the magazine's annual roundup of favorite restaurants, shops, doctors, summer camps, live bands and more in Arlington County, Virginia.

Political career

Beyer was the northern Virginia coordinator of the Gerald L. Baliles's campaign for governor in 1985. In 1986, Governor Baliles appointed Beyer to the Commonwealth Transportation Board (CTB), which is responsible for overseeing the Virginia Department of Transportation and allocating highway funding to specific projects. It consists of 17 members, including the Secretary of Transportation, Commonwealth Transportation Commissioner, Director of the Department of Rail and Public Transportation, and 14 citizen members who are appointed by the governor and confirmed by the Virginia General Assembly.

Beyer was elected lieutenant governor of Virginia in 1989, defeating Republican state senator Edwina P. Dalton. He was reelected in 1993, defeating Republican Michael Farris 54%-46%, as Republicans George Allen and Jim Gilmore were elected on the same ballot as governor and attorney general, respectively.

Farris's close connection to conservative leaders such as Jerry Falwell of the Moral Majority, Pat Robertson of the Christian Coalition and Phyllis Schlafly of the Eagle Forum, as well as his adherence to the Quiverfull movement, stirred deep-seated feelings and led some prominent Virginia Republicans such as U.S. Senator John Warner to support Beyer rather than Farris.

During his tenure as lieutenant governor, Beyer served as president of the Virginia Senate. He chaired the Virginia Economic Recovery Commission, the Virginia Commission on Sexual Assault, the Virginia Commission on Disabilities, the Poverty Commission and was co-founder of the Northern Virginia Technology Council, an outgrowth of the Chamber of Commerce. He was active in promoting high-tech industries and led the fight to eliminate disincentives in the Virginia Tax Code to high-tech research and development.

He is also credited with writing the original welfare reform legislation in Virginia.

Beyer was the Democratic nominee for governor in 1997, losing to Republican Jim Gilmore. He served as Finance Chairman for Mark Warner's Political Action Committee, "Forward Together", and as the National Treasurer for the 2004 presidential campaign of former Vermont Governor Howard Dean. After Dean withdrew from the race, he served as chairman of the John Kerry campaign in Virginia.

In 2007–08, Beyer endorsed and campaigned extensively for presidential candidate Barack Obama. He chaired the Mid Atlantic Finance Council of Obama for America campaign and served on the campaign's National Finance Council.

The Democratic National Committee appointed Beyer to serve at the 2008 DNC Convention on the Credentials Committee.

Following the 2008 election, President-elect Obama asked Beyer to head up the transition team at the Department of Commerce.

Obama nominated Beyer for United States Ambassador to Switzerland and Liechtenstein on June 12, 2009. In December 2010, Beyer attracted public attention when it was reported that he had warned the Swiss government against offering asylum to WikiLeaks publisher Julian Assange. In March 2013, Beyer received the Thomas Jefferson Award from American Citizens Abroad. The award is presented annually by ACA to recognize State Department members who have rendered outstanding service to Americans overseas. Beyer was recognized for organizing a series of town hall meetings where American citizens overseas could voice concerns and opinions to officials of the State Department. He resigned as ambassador in May 2013.

During the run-up to the 2020 primaries, Beyer endorsed Pete Buttigieg for president. He then endorsed Joe Biden on Super Tuesday.

In June 2022, after a spate of mass shootings in the U.S., Beyer said he would propose a bill to increase taxes on assault-style guns by 1000%. He told Business Insider, "What it's intended to do is provide another creative pathway to actually make some sensible gun control happen. We think that a 1,000% fee on assault weapons is just the kind of restrictive measure that creates enough fiscal impact to qualify for reconciliation."

U.S. House of Representatives

Elections
2014

On January 24, 2014, Beyer announced his candidacy for Virginia's 8th congressional district to succeed retiring Democratic incumbent Jim Moran. It was his first partisan race since losing the 1997 gubernatorial election. He won the June 10 Democratic primary with 45.7% of the vote.

On November 4, Beyer defeated Republican nominee Micah Edmond and three others in the general election receiving 63.1% of the vote. But he had effectively clinched a seat in Congress in the primary. At the time, the 8th was Virginia's second-most Democratic district, with a Cook Partisan Voting Index of D+16 (only the 3rd district was more Democratic).

Beyer is a member of the Congressional Progressive Caucus.

2016

Beyer defeated Republican nominee Charles Hernick, 68.6% to 27.4%.

2018

Beyer defeated Republican nominee Thomas Oh, 76.3% to 23.7%.

2020

Beyer defeated Republican nominee Jeff Jordan, 75.8% to 24.0%.

Tenure 
Beyer was a frequent critic of the Trump administration. On April 13, 2017, he was the first lawmaker to call for senior White House adviser and Trump son-in-law Jared Kushner to lose his security clearance after it was revealed that Kushner had omitted numerous contacts with foreign nationals from his security clearance application. In June 2017, Beyer renewed his call, sending a letter signed by more than 50 other House Democrats demanding that the White House immediately revoke Kushner's clearance, citing national security concerns.

Beyer wrote the Cost of Police Misconduct Act, which proposed to create a publicly accessible federal database over police misconduct allegations and settlements.

Committee assignments
Committee on Science, Space and Technology
Subcommittee on Research and Technology
Subcommittee on Space and Aeronautics (Chair)
Committee on Ways and Means
Subcommittee on Trade
Subcommittee on Select Revenue Measures
Joint Economic Committee (Chair)

Caucus memberships
 New Democrat Coalition
 Congressional Arts Caucus
Climate Solutions Caucus
Caucus on Macedonia and Macedonian-Americans
U.S.-Japan Caucus
Medicare for All Caucus
Congressional Progressive Caucus
 Congressional Freethought Caucus
 Americans Abroad Caucus

Personal life
Beyer and his wife, Megan, have two children, Clara and Grace. He also has two children, Don and Stephanie, from a previous marriage, and two grandchildren.

As of May 2019, according to OpenSecrets.org, Beyer's net worth was more than $124 million.

References

External links

 Congressman Don Beyer official U.S. House website
 Don Beyer for Congress
 

|-

|-

1950 births
20th-century American businesspeople
20th-century American politicians
21st-century American businesspeople
21st-century American politicians
Ambassadors of the United States to Liechtenstein
Ambassadors of the United States to Switzerland
American automobile salespeople
Businesspeople from Alexandria, Virginia
Businesspeople from Washington, D.C.
Candidates in the 1997 United States elections
Democratic Party members of the United States House of Representatives from Virginia
Gonzaga College High School alumni
Lieutenant Governors of Virginia
Living people
People from Trieste
Politicians from Alexandria, Virginia
Politicians from Washington, D.C.
Williams College alumni